The Church of St. Irene is a Greek Orthodox church on the island of Ios, Greece. It is located in the south side of the port of Ios in Yialos and it was built in the 17th century.

Architecture

The church has two bell towers. One over the entrance in the church and another one over the gate with seven and three bells respectively.

Very close to the church, under a tree lies a mysterious 17th-18th century grave with engraved square and compasses symbol and a skull and bones symbol. The writing on it is altered and it is not readable. It's not known to who the grave belongs to but it is assumed that it is of a pirate.

References

Eastern Orthodox church buildings in Greece
Ios